Rebekah Teasdale (born april ) is a British DJ and dance music producer, known professionally as DJ Rebekah. She runs the Decoy and Elements labels, and produces and deejays industrial techno.

Early life 
Rebekah Teasdale was born  and grew up in Birmingham, going to techno parties at the Que Club and studying music production at Access Creative College. She also worked as a glamour model.

Career 
DJ Rebekah started to play records professionally whilst in her twenties, signing up with Judge Jules' agency Serious. She moved to London and then Berlin, making a name as a DJ for playing industrial techno sets. She met Chris Liebing and was released on his CLR label. She has released tracks on labels such as EarToGround, Gynoid Audio, Naked Lunch, Sleaze and Stolen Moments. She runs the record labels Decoy Records and Elements and released her first LP entitled Fear Paralysis in 2017. She was voted best producer by DJ Mag in 2018.

DJ Rebekah now performs sober. In September 2020, she released an open letter to the music industry on Change.org following allegations of sexual assault against Eric Morrillo and Derrick May, launching a campaign called #ForTheMusic.

References

External links 

People from Birmingham, West Midlands
Electronic dance music DJs
DJs from Birmingham
Women DJs
1980s births
Living people